Słupienica (Ger. Wiesen Bach) is a stream of northwest Poland, a right tributary of the Rudzianka. It flows through the northern part of the Bukowa Primeval Forest in the West Pomeranian Voivodeship.

Course
The stream arises from numerous small springs on the northern slope of the main range of the Bukowe Hills to the east of Kołówko. Approximately 300 m before the estuary into the Rudzianka, there is the Słupieniec erratic boulder on the right bank. Immediately before the mouth, there is a small marshy pool at the eastern end of the Czwójdziński Gate.

A marked green tourist trail leads along the stream.

References

Rivers of West Pomeranian Voivodeship